Kauf MICH! ("Buy ME!") is the ninth album by Die Toten Hosen, released in 1993. The LP is mainly a concept album dealing with consumerism and ultraconservatism. Along with the album's art and several songs addressing commerce, satirical advertisements and infomercials are interspersed among the music. In addition, the concept of right wing extremism as exemplified by ultraconservatism and neo-Nazism in the songs "Wilkommen in Deutschland" and "Sascha ...ein aufrechter Deutscher" is explored, which excited controversy during the time of the album's release. It was a best-selling album in Germany for 13 weeks in 1993, also selling well in Austria and Switzerland.

Tracks 6 & 8 are mock infomercials performed by Gerhard Polt and Gisela Schneeberger and directed by Hanns Christian Müller. "Wünsch DIR was" has an intro sung by the children's choir "Mosquito" from the music school in Meerbusch.

Track listing
 "Umtausch ausgeschlossen!" (roughly "no exchanges!" in a retail sense) (Rohde/Frege) – 2:18
 "Niemals einer Meinung" ("Never of the same opinion") (Frege/Frege) – 3:44
 "Hot-Clip-Video-Club" (Rohde/Frege) – 4:01
 "Willkommen in Deutschland" ("Welcome to Germany") (Breitkopf/Frege) – 3:56
 "Drunter, drauf & drüber" ("Under, on and over") (Frege, Müller/Frege, Müller) – 3:02
 "Erotim-Super-3-feucht" ("ES3-damp") – 0:31 
 "Kauf MICH!" ("Buy ME!") (Breitkopf/Frege, Müller) – 3:30
 "Die Homolka Kettensäge" ("The Homolka chainsaw") – 0:36
 "Sascha ...ein aufrechter Deutscher" ("Sascha ...an upstanding German") (Frege, Müller/Frege, Müller) – 2:34
 "Gewissen" ("Conscience") (Breitkopf/Frege, Müller) – 2:41
 "Gute Reise" ("A good trip") (von Holst/Frege) – 5:04
 "Alles aus Liebe" ("All out of love") (Frege/Frege) – 4:34
 "Wünsch DIR was" (roughly "Make a wish") (Meurer/Frege) – 4:15
 "Mein größter Feind" ("My biggest enemy") (von Holst/Frege) – 3:08
 "Rambo Dance" (Meurer/Frege/Talk by Tom Gerhardt) – 4:09
 "Katastrophen-Kommando" ("Catastrophe commando") (von Holst/Frege) – 4:30
 "Der letzte Tag" ("The last day") - 3:28 (hidden track)
 "Der letzte Tag" is a separate track on the remastered version.

2007 remastered anniversary edition bonus tracks
For the 25th anniversary of the group all albums from 1983 to 2002 were remastered and re-released. The remasters have a second booklet and additional songs. The re-release of Kauf MICH! has the album's b-sides for bonus tracks. There are actually 3 parts of "Der heiße Draht", on which people sing DTH songs over the phone. However, for the remaster, only a "best of" was compiled out of the three.

<li> "Krieg und Frieden" ("War and peace") (Meurer/Frege) − 4:58 (from "...wünsch DIR was")
<li> "Im Namen des Herrn" ("In the name of the Lord") (Frege/Frege) − 2:08 (from "...wünsch DIR was")
<li> "Auf dem Weg zur Nummer 1" ("On the way to number 1") (Rohde/Frege) − 4:01 (from "Alles aus Liebe")
<li> "5 Minuten" ("5 minutes") (von Holst/Frege) − 3:01 (from "Alles aus Liebe")
<li> "Hilfe" ("Help") (von Holst/Frege) − 3:24 (from "Kauf MICH!")
 "Der heiße Draht (Best of)" ("The hot wire") − 6:09 (from "Kauf MICH!")

Demos
Several unreleased demos from the album surfaced in 2007 with the re-release of most DTH albums.

"Das kleine ABC" (The little ABC) (von Holst/Frege) – 3:34 (released on Damenwahl)
"Aufgeben (gilt nicht)" (Giving up (is not a choice)) (Frege/Frege) – 5:01 (released on Damenwahl)
"Gipfelstürmer" (Summiteer) (Meurer/Frege) – 3:45 (released on Damenwahl)
"Einmal in vier Jahren" (Once in four years) (Breitkopf/Frege) – 4:49 (released on Ein kleines bisschen Horrorschau)
"Schwarze Sheriffs" (Black sheriffs) (Frege/von Holst) – 3:39 (released on Ein kleines bisschen Horrorschau)

"Einmal in vier Jahren" has been previously available in a live version on Im Auftrag des Herrn.

Personnel
Campino - vocals
Andreas von Holst - guitar
Michael Breitkopf - guitar
Andreas Meurer - bass
Wolfgang Rohde - drums

Charts

References

Die Toten Hosen albums
1993 albums
Concept albums
German-language albums